Allium elmendorfii is a species of wild onion endemic to Texas. It is known only from Bexar, Frio, Wilson, and Atascosa Counties. It is generally found on sandy soils, specifically "well-drained sands, Eocene, Pleistocene and Holocene sands, and has only a 400 x 160 km range." Its habitat is "Forest/Woodland, Savanna, Woodland - Hardwood" and specifically "{g}rassland openings in post oak (Quercus stellata) woodlands on deep, well-drained sands derived from Queen City and similar Eocene formations."

Allium elmendorfii is a perennial bulb-forming herb with clusters of small bulbils around the roots, but without the dry papery outer layers that the domesticated onions have. It has an umbel of 10-30 erect to spreading flowers, each with 6 white to pinkish tepals about 5 cm (2 inches) long, flowering from March to April or May.

Distribution

Uses
Allium elmendorfii is related to the common domesticated onion, Allium cepa L., and has a similar aroma. It can be eaten in the same manner, as can most of the members of the genus.

References

Citation for data on website including State Distribution, Watershed, and Reptile Range maps:
NatureServe. 2018. NatureServe Explorer: An online encyclopedia of life [web application]. Version 7.1. NatureServe, Arlington, Virginia. Available http://explorer.natureserve.org. (Accessed: March 21, 2019 ).

Citation for Bird Range Maps of North America: 
Ridgely, R.S., T.F. Allnutt, T. Brooks, D.K. McNicol, D.W. Mehlman, B.E. Young, and J.R. Zook. 2003. Digital Distribution Maps of the Birds of the Western Hemisphere, version 1.0. NatureServe, Arlington, Virginia, USA.

Acknowledgement Statement for Bird Range Maps of North America: 
"Data provided by NatureServe in collaboration with Robert Ridgely, James Zook, The Nature Conservancy - Migratory Bird Program, Conservation International - CABS, World Wildlife Fund - US, and Environment Canada - WILDSPACE."

Citation for Mammal Range Maps of North America: 
Patterson, B.D., G. Ceballos, W. Sechrest, M.F. Tognelli, T. Brooks, L. Luna, P. Ortega, I. Salazar, and B.E. Young. 2003. Digital Distribution Maps of the Mammals of the Western Hemisphere, version 1.0. NatureServe, Arlington, Virginia, USA.

Acknowledgement Statement for Mammal Range Maps of North America: 
"Data provided by NatureServe in collaboration with Bruce Patterson, Wes Sechrest, Marcelo Tognelli, Gerardo Ceballos, The Nature Conservancy-Migratory Bird Program, Conservation International-CABS, World Wildlife Fund-US, and Environment Canada-WILDSPACE."

Citation for Amphibian Range Maps of the Western Hemisphere: 
IUCN, Conservation International, and NatureServe. 2004. Global Amphibian Assessment. IUCN, Conservation International, and NatureServe, Washington, DC and Arlington, Virginia, USA.

Acknowledgement Statement for Amphibian Range Maps of the Western Hemisphere: 
"Data developed as part of the Global Amphibian Assessment and provided by IUCN-World Conservation Union, Conservation International and NatureServe."

NOTE: Full metadata for the Bird Range Maps of North America is available at:
https://web.archive.org/web/20160616213828/http://www.natureserve.org/library/birdDistributionmapsmetadatav1.pdf.

Full metadata for the Mammal Range Maps of North America is available at:
https://web.archive.org/web/20160616213504/http://www.natureserve.org/library/mammalsDistributionmetadatav1.pdf.

elmendorfii
Flora of Texas
Onions
Plants described in 1950